Curtain Up is a 1952 British comedy film directed by Ralph Smart and starring Robert Morley, Margaret Rutherford and Kay Kendall. Written by Jack Davies and Michael Pertwee it is based on the play On Monday Next by Philip King. It was shot at Isleworth Studios in London with the exterior of the nearby Richmond Theatre standing in for that of Drossmouth. The film's sets were designed by the art director Geoffrey Drake.

Plot
In an English provincial town, Drossmouth, a second-rate repertory company assembles at the Theatre Royal on Monday morning to rehearse the following week's play, a melodrama titled Tarnished Gold.

Harry, their irascible producer, is highly critical of the play, which has been foisted on him by the directors of the company and is unenthusiastic about its prospects. The cast includes Jerry, a young and sometimes keen actor, Maud, a widowed actress who was once famous on the West End stage, Sandra, who is waiting for (and receives) a call from a London producer, her philandering and semi-alcoholic husband, and Avis, a timid young girl who is quickly realising that acting is not for her.

The cast is equally unenthusiastic of the play. Little progress is made. 'Jacko', the stage director, is at his wits end and threatens to resign, his regular habit when things go wrong. Just as matters seemingly cannot get worse, the author of the play, Catherine Beckwith, appears and insists on 'sitting at the feet' of the director.

She and Harry are quickly at each other's throats. Harry tears up most of Act 1 and storms angrily off stage, falling into the pit and injuring himself. Despite the forebodings of the cast, Miss Beckwith insists on taking over the rehearsal according to her own ideas. However, Harry recovers and recasts the play as a period piece.

A week later, to everyone's surprise, the curtain comes down on a triumphant first night.

Cast
 Robert Morley as W.H. 'Harry' Derwent Blacker
 Margaret Rutherford as Catherine Beckwith / Jeremy St. Claire
 Kay Kendall as Sandra Beverley
 Michael Medwin as Jerry Winterton
 Olive Sloane as Maud Baron	
 Liam Gaffney as Norwood Beverley
 Lloyd Lamble as Jackson
 Charlotte Mitchell as Daphne Ray
 Joan Rice as Avis
 Charles Lamb as George
 Constance Lorne as  Sarah Stebbins
 Maggie Hanley as  Mary 
 Stringer Davis as  Vicar
 Joan Hickson as Harry's Landlady
 John Cazabon as  Mr Stebbins
 Diana Calderwood as  Set Painter
 Sam Kydd as 	Ambulanceman

Critical reception
The notice in The New York Times stated: "the provincial repertory company gets a gentle and mildly whacky going-over in Curtain Up, the British import that began a stand at the Sixtieth Street Trans-Lux on Saturday. It has such assets as Robert Morley and Margaret Rutherford, who easily manage to be quite superior to the threadbare situations in which they are involved, and it has the glaring deficit of being static for lengthy periods. With Curtain Up, the actors have the opportunity of delivering some humorous lines here and there, but not too much else." The Allmovie adds that "the delectable Kay Kendall provides a few sublime moments as the velvet-voiced leading lady."

References

External links
 
 

1952 films
1952 comedy films
British comedy films
Films directed by Ralph Smart
British black-and-white films
1950s English-language films
British films based on plays
Films shot at Isleworth Studios
Films set in England
1950s British films